Edmund Brokesbourne (c. 1340 – 1396/97), of Bradfield, Essex, was an English politician.

Brokesbourne was a Member of Parliament for Essex in 1386.

References

1340 births
1396 deaths
1397 deaths
English MPs 1386
14th-century English politicians
People from Tendring (district)